Scallon is a surname. Notable people with the surname include: 

Dana Rosemary Scallon (born 1951), Irish singer and politician, known as Dana
Robert Scallon (1857–1939), British officer in the Indian Army
Rob Scallon (born 1990), American YouTuber and musician